Beverly Anne Botha (born 23 October 1953) is a South African former cricketer who played as a right-handed batter. She appeared in three Test matches for South Africa in 1972, all against New Zealand, scoring 139 runs with a high score of 72. She played domestic cricket for Southern Transvaal.

References

External links
 
 

1953 births
Living people
Cricketers from Johannesburg
South African women cricketers
South Africa women Test cricketers
Central Gauteng women cricketers